Rositsa Atanasova Velkova-Zheleva (born 1972) is a Bulgarian politician, who has served as Minister of Finance in the Donev government since 2 August 2022.

References 

1972 births
Living people
21st-century Bulgarian politicians
21st-century Bulgarian women politicians
Independent politicians in Bulgaria
Finance ministers of Bulgaria
Women government ministers of Bulgaria
21st-century Bulgarian economists
Bulgarian women economists
Female finance ministers